Danil Vadimovich Poluboyarinov (born 4 February 1997) is a Russian football player. He plays for Akron Tolyatti on loan from Torpedo Moscow.

Club career
He made his debut in the Russian Football National League for FC Spartak-2 Moscow on 21 May 2016 in a game against FC Tom Tomsk.

On 15 July 2022, Poluboyarinov was loaned to Akron Tolyatti for the season.

Honours
Torpedo Moscow
 Russian Football National League : 2021-22

References

External links
 Profile by Russian Football National League
 
 

1997 births
Sportspeople from Ashgabat
Living people
Russian footballers
Association football midfielders
Russia youth international footballers
FC Spartak Moscow players
FC Spartak-2 Moscow players
FC Energetik-BGU Minsk players
FC Rotor Volgograd players
FC Volgar Astrakhan players
FC Torpedo Moscow players
FC Akron Tolyatti players
Russian First League players
Belarusian Premier League players
Russian expatriate footballers
Expatriate footballers in Belarus
Russian expatriate sportspeople in Belarus